The 2017–18 San Diego Toreros women's basketball team represents the University of San Diego in the 2017–18 college basketball season. The Toreros, as members of the West Coast Conference, were led by thirteenth year head coach Cindy Fisher. The Toreros play their home games at the Jenny Craig Pavilion on the university campus in San Diego, California. They finished the season 17–15, 8–10 in WCC play to finish in sixth place. They advanced to the championship game of the WCC women's tournament where they lost to Gonzaga.

Previous season
They finished the season 14–16, 7–11 in WCC play to finish in seventh place. They advanced to the quarterfinals of the WCC women's tournament where they lost to BYU.

Roster

Schedule

|-
!colspan=9 style=| Exhibition

|-
!colspan=9 style=| Non-conference regular season

|-
!colspan=9 style=| WCC regular season

|-
!colspan=9 style=| WCC Women's Tournament

Rankings
2017–18 NCAA Division I women's basketball rankings

References

San Diego
San Diego Toreros women's basketball seasons
San Diego Toreros
San Diego Toreros